Blowin' Away is the eighteenth studio album (and twentieth overall) by Joan Baez, released in 1977. It was her first after switching from A&M Records to Portrait Records (a then newly created division of CBS Records).

Overview
The album veered more toward mainstream pop than any album Baez had recorded up to that point, though many critics at the time pointed out that she seemed not entirely comfortable with her "new sound".  Among the songs covered were the Rod Stewart hit "Sailing", and the standard "Cry Me a River", in addition to a number of Baez' own compositions.  The sardonic "Time Rag" recounts an aborted attempt at an interview by a Time magazine reporter. Throughout the course of the song, she admits that studio executives wanted to spruce up her image to ensure that she'd once again sell well. "I really should tell you that deep in my heart/I don't give a damn where I stand on the charts", she wryly comments toward the song's closing.

From "Time Rag":

"Curious about his interest,
I babbled my way through the worldwide list;
Ireland, Chile and the African states;
Poetry, politics and how they relate;
Motherhood, music and Moog synthesizers;
Political prisoners and Commie sympathizers;
Hetero, homo and bisexuality;
Where they all stand in the nineteen-seventies."

Baez wrote "Altar Boy and the Thief" as a tribute to her gay fanbase.

In her autobiography, "And a Voice to Sing With", Baez described Blowin' Away as "a good album with a terrible cover".

Track listing
All tracks composed by Joan Baez; except where indicated

 "Sailing" (Gavin Sutherland) – 4:22
 "Many a Mile to Freedom" (Steve Winwood, Anna Capaldi) – 2:58
 "Miracles" – 5:24
 "Yellow Coat" (Steve Goodman) – 3:37
 "Time Rag" – 5:25
 "A Heartfelt Line or Two" – 3:23
 "I'm Blowin' Away" (Eric Kaz) – 3:18
 "Luba the Baroness" – 7:06
 "Altar Boy and the Thief" – 3:28
 "Cry Me a River" (Arthur Hamilton) – 3:00

Personnel 
 Joan Baez – Guitar, Vocals
 Bernard Gelb – Executive Producer
 David Kershenbaum – Producer
 String arrangements - Tom Scott
 Drums - Mike Botts, Rick Shlosser
 Bass - Duck Dunn, Wilton Felder
 Electric guitars - Elliot Randall, Dean Parks
 Keyboards - Larry Knechtel, Joe Sample
 Acoustic guitar - Elliott Randall
 Percussion - Mike Botts
 Steel guitar - Jeff Baxter
 Violin, Mandolin, Steel guitar - David Mansfield

References
 Baez, Joan. 1987. And a Voice to Sing With: A Memoir. Century Hutchinson, London. 

1977 albums
Joan Baez albums
Portrait Records albums
Albums produced by David Kershenbaum